Tennis returned to the Summer Olympic Games as a demonstration sport for the second time in 60 years at the 1984 Summer Olympics in Los Angeles, California, United States.

Two events (men's and women's singles) were contested at these Games. The competition venue was the Los Angeles Tennis Center at the University of California, Los Angeles (UCLA).
Each event had 32 players, and players under 21 years old were eligible to enter the tournament.

Results

See also
 Tennis at the Friendship Games

References

 
1984
1984 Summer Olympics events
Olympics
1984 Olympics
1984 in American tennis
Olympic demonstration sports